Piano Solos is the debut album by American pianist George Winston. It features his first compositions and covers. American guitarist John Fahey co-produced the album with Doug Decker, who engineered it.

First released in 1973 on Takoma Records, it was reissued in 1981 by Windham Hill Records as Ballads and Blues 1972. It was released on CD in 1994 by Winston's Dancing Cat label, with a remastered release on October 5, 2006, along with five bonus tracks.

Track listing

References

1972 debut albums
George Winston albums
Takoma Records albums
Albums produced by John Fahey (musician)
Windham Hill Records albums